Strictly Roots is an album by Jamaican reggae group Morgan Heritage released on March 31, 2015. It earned the group a Grammy Award for Best Reggae Album. The album topped the Top Reggae Albums chart both in 2015 and 2016.

It features several guest appearances by Chronixx, Stephen Marley's son Jo Mersa Marley, Gil Sharone, Jemere Morgan, Eric Rachmany, J Boog, and the bassist vocalist of the Soldiers of Jah Army Bobby Lee Jefferson.

Track listing 
 "Strictly Roots" - 3:41
 "Child Of JAH" (featuring Chronixx) - 4:13
 "Light It Up" (featuring Jo Mersa Marley) - 4:15
 "Rise And Fall" - 4:06
 "Perform And Done" - 3:48
 "So Amazing" (featuring Gil Sharone, J Boog, Jemere Morgan) - 4:00
 "Wanna Be Loved" (featuring Eric Rachmany) - 4:14
 "Why Dem Come Around" - 3:16
 "We Are Warriors" (featuring Bobby Lee Jefferson) - 3:38
 "Put It On Me" - 3:45
 "Sunday Morning" - 3:57
 "Celebrate Life" - 4:21

Charts

References 

2015 albums
Grammy Award for Best Reggae Album
Morgan Heritage albums